The 1983 Australian Endurance Championship was a CAMS sanctioned motor racing title for drivers of Group C Touring Cars. The championship was contested over a six round series with all rounds run concurrently with those of the 1983 Australian Endurance Championship of Makes.

Wollongong based Peter McLeod's consistent run over the series which saw him score points in all but the Castrol 400 at Sandown, won his first (and only) touring car championship driving his Slick 50 sponsored Mazda RX-7. Second was the JPS Team BMW 635 CSi of triple Bathurst 1000 winner Jim Richards, with Nissan Motorsport driver George Fury third in his Bluebird Turbo.

Fury, who won the opening two rounds of the series, and the Holden Dealer Team's star driver Peter Brock, who won the James Hardie 1000 at Bathurst and the final round in Adelaide, were the only multiple winners in the 1983 AEC (though Brock received no points from his Bathurst win due to it being in the team's second car and not his nominated one; also surprisingly one of his co-drivers, Larry Perkins, did receive points for the win). The other winners were 1983 ATCC winner Allan Moffat who drove his Mazda RX-7 to victory in the Castrol 400, and Allan Grice who drove his Roadways Commodore to victory at Surfers Paradise.

Calendar

Class structure
Cars competed in two engine displacement classes:
 Up to 3000cc
 Over 3000cc

Points structure
Championship points were awarded to the top twenty finishers at each round according to the outright position attained. If two drivers shared a car the points were split between the two drivers, except at Round 4 where two driver combinations were mandated by regulations, removing the single driver option. Full points to both drivers were awarded. The exception appears to have been made for third drivers however as Peter Brock received no points for winning Round 4 alongside Larry Perkins and John Harvey.:

Results

References

External links
 Images from the 1983 James Hardie 1000 at Bathurst, www.autopics.com.au

Australian Endurance Championship
Endurance Championship